The 2016 season was the Western Bulldogs' 91st year in the Australian Football League (AFL). It was just their second year under coach Luke Beveridge, with Robert Murphy being appointed captain for the second year in a row. However, due to an injury Murphy suffered in the opening rounds of the season, Easton Wood took over the captaincy for the remainder of the year. The club's regular season began on the 27th of March against the Fremantle Dockers at Marvel Stadium. The Bulldogs finished off the home & away season with 15 wins and 7 losses, placing them at 7th on the ladder. The Bulldogs went on to win the 2016 AFL Grand Final, capturing their first VFL/AFL Premiership since 1954.

Playing list

Changes
At the end of the 2015 season, the Bulldogs delisted Ayce Cordy, Brett Goodes, Matthew Fuller, Sam Darley, Daniel Pearce, Jordan Kelly and Jarrad Grant from their list. Grant was later recruited by the Gold Coast. as delisted free agents. Michael Talia was also traded to Sydney after controversy surrounding him allegedly leaking game plans to his brother.

Premiership season

Round 1

Round 2

Round 3

Round 4

Round 5

Round 6

Round 7

Round 8

Round 9

Round 10

Round 11

Round 12

Round 13

Round 14

Round 15

Round 16

Round 17

Round 18

Round 19

Round 20

Round 21

Round 22

Round 23

Ladder

2016 AFL Finals Series

Week one (elimination final)

Second elimination final (West Coast v Western Bulldogs)
The opening match of the 2016 finals series saw the first final played on a Thursday night as opposed to the traditional Friday night start to a finals series with the sixth placed  hosting the seventh placed  at Domain Stadium. The  had qualified for their second consecutive finals series for the first time since 2010 and battled with injuries throughout the year, finishing with a 15–7 win–loss record. Despite this, they managed to beat the Eagles, Crows and  during the home and away season.

This was the first final between the two sides in ten years, with the Eagles defeating the Bulldogs comfortably in the 2006 First Semi Final, also at Subiaco Oval, by 74 points en route to securing the 2006 premiership. They also met in the 1998 Qualifying Final at the MCG, with the  winning by 70 points.

The only meeting between the two clubs in the regular season saw the Western Bulldogs win a close-fought contest by eight points at Etihad Stadium in round 11.

Scorecard

Week two (semi-finals)

Second semi-final (Hawthorn v Western Bulldogs)

Scorecard

First preliminary final (Greater Western Sydney v Western Bulldogs)

Week four (Grand Final)

See also 
 2016 AFL season
 2016 AFL Grand Final

References

All games by season:2016

Western Bulldogs
2016